Karl Fröschl (born 2 November 1926) is an Austrian former sports shooter. He competed in the 50 metre rifle, prone event at the 1972 Summer Olympics.

References

External links
 

1926 births
Possibly living people
Austrian male sport shooters
Olympic shooters of Austria
Shooters at the 1972 Summer Olympics
Place of birth missing (living people)
20th-century Austrian people